Craig S. Kaplan is a Philadelphia-area promotions and marketing agent who has been in the industry since the late 1980s. He specializes in creating unique, creative content, utilizing both digital and traditional media, for his clients.

Early career

Kaplan was an account manager at Comcast Cable Vision from September 1988 - December 1992.
Kaplan was an advertising sales manager at Comcast Cable Vision from January 1993 - December 1994.
Kaplan was President at All Star Promotion from January 1995 – December 2009. 
Kaplan was President of MilkBoy Communications from December 2009 – December 2011
Kaplan has been President of Hashtag Multimedia, where he currently works, since January 2012.

History

Athletes

Kaplan has secured endorsements for NHL Hall of Famer Paul Coffey, Olympic Gold Medalist Meldrick Taylor, NFL Hall of Famer Jack Ham, future NFL Hall of Famer Brian Dawkins and was Jon Runyan’s manager for his entire nine-year career with the Philadelphia Eagles, securing Runyan major endorsements with McDonald’s and Ford Motors as well as negotiating all of his many radio and TV shows that he was involved in.

Kaplan secured an endorsement deal with Visa and Chrysler for Irving Fryar, a deal with McDonald's and Ford for Runyan, and a deal with Doneckers in Ephrata, PA for David Akers. Kaplan has also secured an endorsement deal with Woodbury Nissan for Omar Gaither, additional deals include Comcast MetroPhone for Keith Byars, established Herschel Walker as the spokesperson for Threadz Clothing, and secured a deal with Starter Inc. and Jeep for Seth Joyner. He also orchestrated an endorsement with Cadillac for Hank Fraley, an endorsement deal with Davis Acura and Liscio’s Bakery for Hunter Pence, and secured an endorsement deal with Gerhards and Liscio’s Bakery for Ryan Madson.

Kaplan negotiated a role in Oliver Stone’s film, Any Given Sunday for Irving Fryar. Kaplan conducted the negotiation on Fryar’s book deal and came up with the title for Fryar’s book, Sunday is My Day. Kaplan also negotiated a contract and Associate Producer credit for Comcast SportsNet Inaugural sports talk show, "Angelo and Irving."

One of Kaplan’s largest athlete clients has been Jon Runyan. Kaplan was Runyan’s manager during his career in Philadelphia, starting in 2000.  Kaplan has worked on Runyan’s charity golf event, Jon Runyan’s Score for the Cure, which has raised half a million dollars in the five years since the first event. Along with securing Runyan as a contributor to Daily News Live, in 2004 Kaplan sold Runyan’s Rockin’ With Runyan radio show to Y100 and secured a deal to sell Rockin’ With Runyan T-shirts in Modell’s sporting goods stores. Kaplan also helped create Runyan’s Reserve Beer with Iron Hill Brewery in Media, PA, where Runyan would go after each Rockin’ show; a dollar from every beer sold was donated to the Cystic Fibrosis Foundation.

After securing Hunter Pence as the celebrity spokesperson for Liscio’s Bakery in 2012, Kaplan produced a commercial for the bakery starring their new spokesman. The commercial, "Liscio’s: ‘Let’s Go Eat!’," features Pence demonstrating the different uses he finds for Liscio’s Bakery rolls. The commercial received immediate response on Twitter. Metro Philly had this to say of the commercial: "The Liscio’s Bakery ad featuring Hunter Pence, with his catchphrase, ‘Let’s Go Eat!’ is priceless, also a TV commercial that is equally hilarious." PhillyBurbs, a Philadelphia based blog, wrote, "Something tells me the guys in the clubhouse are going to have some fun with this. Might I suggest a kayak and a crate of delicious Liscio’s torpedo rolls waiting at Pence’s locker in time for his arrival Monday morning?" In what may be the most prominent review of the commercial, Philadelphia Magazine’s Dan McQuade states, "This might be the greatest commercial in TV history... How does he keep such a physique by lifting Liscio’s roll?!" Kaplan strengthened the Pence-Liscio’s relationship by creating a bi-weekly web series airing on YouTube, "Liscio’s Bakery: Weekly Bites", which features a different shop that serves Liscio’s Bakery bread.

Chefs

A recent collaboration with James Beard Award-winning chef Marc Vetri was a promotional video 'Sounds Good, Tastes Good' shot at New York City’s only four-star Italian restaurant, Del Posto." Performing alongside Vetri were Grammy Nominated musician Phil Roy, Joe Bastianich (Master Chef co-host), Tom Colicchio (Colicchio & Sons, Top Chef) and John Pizzarelli. Kaplan and his firm designed, and now maintain the Vetri Family website; Kaplan also has shot dozens of videos, promoting the Vetri Family of Restaurants and the Vetri Foundation for Children.

Charity

Kaplan has secured celebrity spokespersons and/or corporate sponsors for charity events diverse as The Tiger Woods Foundation celebrity Pro-Am, The Great Chef Event, Bowl with the Birds, the LPGA ShopRite Classic, Jon Runyan’s Score for the Cure, and the Jimmy Rollins Family Foundation’s events One Night in Harlem, Havana Nights and A Night in Paris.

Kaplan secured corporate sponsors from 2009-2012 for MANNA’s event, "Shut Up and Dance." Kaplan also produced a promotional video for MANNA’s 20th anniversary "Shut Up and Dance," as well as a promotional video about the benefits of MANNA.

Kaplan produced the 2012 Philabundance Public Service Announcement TV-spot, "Hunger Doesn’t Take a Vacation." Kaplan secured Hunter Pence as the Philabundance spokesperson and Liscio’s Bakery as their corporate sponsor; Kaplan went on to use Pence in a billboard campaign he created for Philabundance, underwritten by Liscio’s Bakery.
 
Kaplan began working with the Variety (Children’s Charity) in 1998 when he secured their first celebrity spokesperson, Irving Fryar; he went on to secure Jon Runyan as a celebrity spokesperson in 2000. He has since contracted celebrity bartenders and various celebrity spokespersons for the Variety (Children’s Charity). In November 2009, Kaplan helped create the Celebrity Bowling Classic; the evening was hosted by Ryan Madson and Brent Celek and raised five figures for the charity.

In 2001, Kaplan ran the Allen Iverson Summer Classic Celebrity Softball Game. Kaplan also secured corporate sponsors and celebrity spokespersons for the event, including Kevin Garnett and Stephon Marbury.

Kaplan secured celebrity guests to attend the Camden Aquarium’s grand opening gala in 1992.

Kaplan secured a major donor to fund the creation of a new treatment room for the Children’s Hospital of Philadelphia (CHOP). Kaplan has also brought six different athletes into CHOP to in bring gifts, and talk to the children.  In 2008, Kaplan also orchestrated an event with Liscio’s Bakery where people could take a picture with the World Series trophy for donations to CHOP.

Kaplan was the Director of Marketing for the Irving Fryar Foundation from 1997-1999. During his time there he ran the charity golf event which raised six figures for the organization. He also orchestrated three cigar dinner fundraisers which raised a total of five figures for the organization.

Kaplan was also the Director of Marketing for the Jerome Brown Foundation. Kaplan was event coordinator for all fundraising dinners hosted by the charity; he also secured celebrities to attend the events. Kaplan helped the charity raise $200,000 during his time with them.

Kaplan produced a Public Service Announcement campaign for S.C.A.N. (Stop Child Abuse Now). Kaplan also secured corporate sponsorship and celebrity spokesperson, Irving Fryar, for S.C.A.N.

Events

Kaplan has secured celebrity spokespersons and/or corporate sponsors for charity events such as the Great Chef Event, Bowl with the Birds, the LPGA ShopRite Classic, Runyan’s Score for the Cure, and the Jimmy Rollins Family Foundations’ events One Night in Harlem, Havana Nights, and A Night in Paris.

Kaplan has worked with the Great Chefs Event for the past five years. In addition to promoting, coordinating, and securing corporate sponsors and celebrity spokespersons, Kaplan has produced promotional video’s covering the event the past two years. In 2012 the Great Chefs Event raised one million dollars, and in 2013 the event raised $1.1 million.

For Bowl with the Birds, Kaplan selected the charity which would benefit from the event; benefactors have included the Jeremiah Trotter Foundation, the Brian Mitchell Foundation, The Prostate Cancer Foundation, the Alzheimer’s Association, and Variety (Children’s Charity).

Kaplan was responsible for raising over $500,000 in his five years as Event Chairman of Jon Runyan’s Score for the Cure as event Chairman. Kaplan secured benefactors for the event such as the Prostate Cancer Foundation, the Cancer Institute of New Jersey, and the Kimmel Cancer Center.

References

1962 births
Living people